The Parshallburg Bridge, also known as the Ditch Road Bridge, was a bridge that originally carried Ditch Road over the Shiawassee River near Oakley, Michigan. It was listed on the National Register of Historic Places in 1994. It was the only known Thacher through truss bridge in Michigan, and one of only a few remaining in the nation. In 1999, the bridge was moved to a new location, and in 2008 was washed off its piers and destroyed.

History
In 1855, Israel Parshall dammed the Shiawassee River at this location and constructed saw and grist mills located on opposite banks. A hamlet sprang up around the mills, originally called Havana but later known as Parshallville or Parshallburg. It is likely that the first bridge at this location was constructed soon after the mills, and that the original bridge was replaced at a later date, perhaps in the 1870s. An 1889 edition of the Chesaning Argus describes this second bridge as an "iron bridge put up on piles only a few years ago." However, by 1889 this bridge had grown dangerous, and the local highway commission decided to replace it. They contracted with the Wrought Iron Bridge Company of Canton, Ohio to construct a new iron bridge. New abutments were constructed in the summer of 1889, and assembly of the bridge began soon after.

The bridge remained in service until the 1980s. In 1986, it was identified as critically in need of replacement, and in 1992 it was closed to traffic. In 1999, the bridge was relocated to Chesaning, Michigan. However, the piers at the new location were too low for the surrounding area, and in late 2008, the bridge was washed away off its piers by flood and ice, and completely destroyed.

Description
The Parshallburg Bridge was a single-span, Thacher metal through truss bridge, likely made of wrought and cast iron. The Thacher through truss was invented in 1883 by Edwin Thacher, who was then chief engineer of the Keystone Bridge Company of Pittsburgh. Thacher described the truss design as a "combination of the triangular [Pratt/Warren] and suspension [Bollman/Fink] systems," and was designed to eliminate stresses (and subsequent maintenance issues) due to temperature changes.

The bridge's end and upper chords are constructed from parallel channels riveted to cover plates above and lattice bars below. The vertical posts and struts are constructed from two riveted angles connected by lattice bars. The center ties, inclined suspenders, and the lower chords are constructed from eyebars. The top lateral bracing is made of tie rods with turnbuckles. On each end of the bridge was a cast-iron plaque with the words "WROUGHT IRON BRIDGE CO., BUILDERS, CANTON, OHIO."

See also
List of bridges documented by the Historic American Engineering Record in Michigan

References

External links

Images of bridge from HistoricBridges.org

Bridges completed in 1889
Road bridges on the National Register of Historic Places in Michigan
Historic American Engineering Record in Michigan
National Register of Historic Places in Saginaw County, Michigan
Buildings and structures destroyed by flooding
Transportation in Saginaw County, Michigan
1889 establishments in Michigan